Melanie Meilinger (born 27 June 1991) is an Austrian freestyle skier. She competed in the 2018 Winter Olympics in the moguls event.

References

1991 births
Living people
Freestyle skiers at the 2018 Winter Olympics
Austrian female freestyle skiers
Olympic freestyle skiers of Austria
21st-century Austrian women